Tales of the Jedi may refer to various media in the Star Wars universe:

 Tales of the Jedi (comics), a comic book series published by Dark Horse comics from 1993 to 1998
 Tales of the Jedi (TV series), an animated anthology series